Frugerès-les-Mines (also ,) is a commune in the Haute-Loire department in south-central France.

Demography

See also
Communes of the Haute-Loire department

References

Frugereslesmines